This is a list of universities in Mexico.

Federal Universities
General Coordination of Technological and Polytechnic Universities (CGUT)
Universidad Pedagógica Nacional
Instituto Politécnico Nacional
Tecnologico Nacional de México
Universidad Autónoma Agraria Antonio Narro
Universidad Autónoma de Chapingo
Universidad Autónoma Metropolitana
Universidad Nacional Abierta y a Distancia de México
Universidad Nacional Autónoma de México

Institutes of Technology (Branches of Tecnologico Nacional de México)
Instituto Tecnológico de Acapulco
Instituto Tecnológico de Aguascalientes
Instituto Tecnológico de Celaya (:es:Instituto Tecnologico de Celaya)
Instituto Tecnológico de Chetumal (ITCH), Chetumal, Quintana Roo
Instituto Tecnológico de Chihuahua
Instituto Tecnológico de Chihuahua II
Instituto Tecnológico de Ciudad Juárez, Ciudad Juárez, Chihuahua
Instituto Tecnológico de Ciudad Madero (ITCM), Ciudad Madero, Tamaulipas
Instituto Tecnológico de Culiacán, Culiacán, Sinaloa
Instituto Tecnológico de Durango (ITD), Durango, Durango
Instituto Tecnológico de Ensenada (ITE), Ensenada, Baja California
Instituto Tecnológico de Hermosillo (ITH), Hermosillo, Sonora, Torreón, Coahuila
Instituto Tecnológico de La Paz (ITLP), La Paz, Baja California Sur
Instituto Tecnológico de Mexicali (ITM), Mexicali, Baja California
Instituto Tecnológico de Morelia (ITM), Morelia, Michoacán
Instituto Tecnológico de Oaxaca (ITO), Oaxaca, Oaxaca
Instituto Tecnológico de Pabellón de Arteaga
Instituto Tecnológico de Puebla (ITO), Puebla, Puebla
Instituto Tecnológico de Querétaro (ITQ), Santiago de Querétaro, Querétaro
Instituto Tecnológico de Saltillo, Saltillo, Coahuila
Instituto Tecnológico de Sonora
Instituto Tecnológico de Tepic (ITT), Tepic, Nayarit
Instituto Tecnológico de Tijuana (ITT), Tijuana, Baja California
Instituto Tecnológico de Toluca, Toluca
Instituto Tecnológico de Tuxtepec
Instituto Tecnológico de Tuxtla Gutiérrez, Tuxtla Gutiérrez, Chiapas
Instituto Tecnológico del Valle de Oaxaca (ITVO)
Instituto Tecnológico de Veracruz
Instituto Tecnológico de Villahermosa, Villahermosa, Tabasco
Instituto Tecnológico de Zacatepec
Instituto Tecnológico El Llano (ITLLANO)
Instituto Tecnologico Superior de Acayucan
Instituto Tecnológico Superior de Cajeme
Instituto Tecnológico Superior de Ciudad Constitución (ITSCC), Ciudad Constitución, B. C. S.
Instituto Tecnológico de Minatitlán (ITM) Minatitlán, Veracruz
Instituto Tecnológico Superior de Coatzacoalcos (ITESCO), Coatzacoalcos, Veracruz
Instituto Tecnologico Superior de Poza Rica (ITSPR), Poza Rica, Veracruz
Instituto Tecnológico Superior de Puerto Penasco (ITSPP)
Instituto Tecnológico Superior de Zacapoaxtla (ITSZ), Zacapoaxtla, Puebla
Instituto Tecnológico Superior del Sur de Guanajuato
Instituto Tecnológico Superior Zacatecas Occidente
Instituto Tecnológico Superior Zapopan

National Universities
Benemérita Universidad Autónoma de Puebla
Universidad Autónoma Benito Juárez de Oaxaca
Universidad Autónoma de Aguascalientes
Universidad Autónoma de Baja California
Universidad Autónoma de Baja California Sur
Universidad Autónoma de Campeche
Universidad Autónoma de Chiapas
Universidad Autónoma de Chihuahua
Universidad Autónoma de Ciudad Juárez
Universidad Autónoma de la Ciudad de México
Universidad Autónoma de Coahuila
Universidad Autónoma de Durango
Universidad Autónoma de Guerrero
Universidad Autónoma de Nayarit
Universidad Autónoma de Nuevo León
Universidad Autónoma de Occidente
Universidad Autónoma de Querétaro
Universidad Autónoma de San Luis Potosí
Universidad Autónoma de Sinaloa
Universidad Autónoma de Tamaulipas
Universidad Autónoma de Tlaxcala
Universidad Autónoma de Yucatán
Universidad Autónoma de Zacatecas
Universidad Autónoma del Carmen
Universidad Autónoma del Estado de Hidalgo
Universidad Autónoma del Estado de México
Universidad Autónoma del Estado de Morelos
Universidad Autónoma Metropolitana
Universidad de Ciencias y Artes de Chiapas
Universidad de Colima
Universidad de Guadalajara
Universidad de Guanajuato
Universidad de Quintana Roo
Universidad de Sonora
Universidad Juárez Autónoma de Tabasco
Universidad Juárez del Estado de Durango
Universidad Michoacana de San Nicolás de Hidalgo
Universidad Veracruzana
Universidad Popular Autónoma De Veracruz

Research centers 

Most of these are related to CONACYT.
Center for Research and Advanced Studies of the National Polytechnic Institute (CINVESTAV)
Centro de Investigacion Cientifica y de Educacion Superior de Ensenada, CICESE
Centro de Investigación en Ciencia Aplicada y Tecnología Avanzada, CICATA
Centro de Investigacion y Docencia Economicas (CIDE)
El Colegio de la Frontera Norte (COLEF)
El Colegio de México (Colmex)
El Colegio de la Frontera Sur (EcoSur)
El Colegio de San Luis Potosí (ColSan)
El Colegio de Michoacán (ColMich)
El Colegio de Postgraduados (ColPos)
Escuela Nacional de Antropología e Historia (ENAH)
Centro de Investigación y Estudios Superiores en Antropología Social (CIESAS)
Centro de Investigación en Ciencias de Información Geoespacial (CentroGeo)
Centro Nacional de las Artes (CENART)
Instituto Potosino de Investigación Científica y Tecnológica (IPICYT)
Instituto Nacional de Astrofísica, Óptica y Electrónica (INAOE)
Instituto de Investigaciones Dr. José María Luis Mora (Instituto Mora)
Facultad Latinoamericana de Ciencias Sociales (FLACSO Mexico)

Regional Universities 
Universidad de las Ciencias y Artes de Chiapas
Universidad del Mar
Universidad del Istmo
Universidad de la Cañada
Universidad de la Sierra Juárez
Universidad de la Sierra Sur, Oaxaca
Universidad Politécnica de Pachuca

Technological Universities 
Universidad Tecnológica de Aguascalientes
Universidad Tecnológica de Netzahualcoyotl
Universidad Tecnológica de Tula Tepeji
Universidad Tecnológica de Querétaro
Universidad Tecnológica de Coahuila
Universidad Tecnológica de la Costa Grande
Universidad Tecnológica "Emiliano Zapata" del Estado de Morelos
Universidad Tecnológica de los Valles Centrales de Oaxaca
Universidad Tecnológica del Estado de Zacatecas
Universidad Tecnológica Fidel Velázquez
Universidad Tecnológica General Mariano Escobedo
Universidad Tecnológica de Hermosillo
Universidad Tecnológica de la Huasteca Hidalguense
Universidad Tecnológica de Huejotzingo
Universidad Tecnológica de Izúcar de Matamoros
Universidad Tecnológica de Jalisco
Universidad Tecnológica de Morelia
Universidad Tecnológica del Sur de Sonora
Universidad Tecnológica de Nogales
Universidad Tecnológica del Norte de Aguascalientes
Universidad Tecnológica del Norte de Coahuila
Universidad Tecnológica del Norte de Guanajuato
Universidad Tecnológica Regional del Sur
Universidad Tecnológica de San Juan del Río
Universidad Tecnológica de San Luis Potosí
Universidad Tecnológica de Santa Catarina
Universidad Tecnológica de la Selva
Universidad Tecnológica del Sur del Estado de México
Universidad Tecnológica del Suroeste de Guanajuato
Universidad Tecnológica de Tabasco
Universidad Tecnológica de Tamaulipas Norte
Universidad Tecnológica de Tecamac
Universidad Tecnológica de Tecamachalco
Universidad Tecnológica de Tijuana
Universidad Tecnológica de Tlaxcala
Universidad Tecnológica de Torreon
Universidad Tecnológica de la Zona Metropolitana de Guadalajara
Universidad Tecnológica de Tulancingo
Universidad Tecnológica del Valle del Mezquital
Universidad Tecnológica de Campeche
Universidad Tecnológica de Cancun
Universidad Tecnológica de Chihuahua
Universidad Tecnológica de Leon
Universidad Tecnológica de Ciudad Juarez
Universidad Tecnológica Metropolitana
Universidad Tecnológica de Matamoros
Universidad Tecnológica de la Región Centro de Coahuila
Universidad Tecnológica de Nayarit
Universidad Tecnológica de Puebla
Universidad Tecnológica de la Sierra Hidalguense
Universidad Tecnológica del Valle de Toluca
Universidad Tecnológica de Xicotepec de Juarez
Universidad Tecnológica de la Zona Metropolitana del Valle de México
Universidad Tecnológica de la Costa
Universidad Tecnológica de Altamira
Universidad Tecnológica de Nuevo Laredo
Universidad Tecnológica del Sureste de Veracruz
Universidad Tecnológica del Usumacinta
Universidad Tecnológica de la Región Norte de Guerrero
Universidad Tecnológica de Bahia de Banderas
Universidad Tecnológica de la Riviera Maya
Universidad Tecnológica del Centro de Veracruz

Private institutions

Universities

Centro de Enseñanza Técnica y Superior (CETYS)
Centro de Estudios Universitarios Xochicalco, CEUX
Centro Universitario Grupo Sol
Centro Universitario México, División de Estudios Superiores (now Universidad Marista)
Escuela Libre de Derecho
Instituto de Estudios Avanzados en Odontologia
Pontifical University of Mexico, Mexico City
Seminario Teológico Juan Calvino, Mexico City
TECH Technological University
Universidad Anáhuac
Universidad Anáhuac del Sur
Universidad Anáhuac del Norte
Universidad Anáhuac Oaxaca
Universidad Autónoma de Guadalajara (UAG), Guadalajara, Jalisco
Universidad Azteca
Universidad Casa Blanca
Universidad Cristóbal Colón
Universidad Cuauhtémoc Plantel Aguascalientes
Universidad De La Salle Bajio, Leon, Guanajuato
Universidad de las Americas, A.C., Mexico City
Universidad de las Américas Puebla (UDLAP), Puebla, Puebla
Universidad Modelo, Mérida, Yucatán
Universidad de Montemorelos, Montemorelos, Nuevo León
Universidad de Monterrey (UDEM)
Universidad de Navojoa, Navojoa, Sinaloa
Universidad de la Veracruz (UNIVER)
Universidad del Claustro de Sor Juana
Universidad del Golfo de México (UGM)
Universidad del Mar, Huatulco, Oaxaca
Universidad del Noreste
Universidad del Nuevo Mundo
Universidad del Valle de México
Universidad España (UNES)
Universidad Humanitas
Universidad Iberoamericana Ciudad de México
Universidad Iberoamericana León
Universidad Iberoamericana Puebla
Universidad Iberoamericana Torreon
Universidad Iberoamericana Tijuana
Universidad Intercontinental
 Universidad Interglobal
Universidad La Salle (ULSA)
Universidad La Salle Pachuca (ULSA Pachuca)
Universidad La Salle Cancun
Universidad Latina de América
Universidad Latina de Mexico
Universidad Latinoamericana
Universidad Linda Vista, Pueblo Nuevo Solistahuacán, Chiapas
Universidad Loyola del Pacífico
Universidad Mexico Internacional
Universidad Marista de Guadalajara
Universidad Marista Ciudad de Mexico
Universidad Marista de Merida
Universidad Marista de Queretaro
Universidad México-Americana del Norte
Universidad Motolinía
Universidad Nacional de Ciencias Penales, Administrativas y de La Seguridad
Universidad Panamericana Sede Guadalajara
Universidad Panamericana Sede México
Universidad Popular Autónoma del Estado de Puebla (UPAEP)
Universidad Regiomontana
Universidad TecMilenio (UTM)
Universidad Tecnológica de México (UNITEC)
ESCENA Escuela de Animación y Arte Digital (ESCENA)

Technological institutes
Instituto Tecnológico Autónomo de México (ITAM), Mexico City
Instituto Tecnológico y de Estudios Superiores de Monterrey (ITESM)
Instituto Tecnológico y de Estudios Superiores de Occidente (ITESO), Guadalajara, Jalisco
Instituto de Estudios Superiores de Tamaulipas (IEST), Tampico, Tamaulipas
Instituto Tecnológico Superior de Sinaloa (ITESUS)

Others
Alliant International University (AIU), Mexico City
Kirjner Business School A.C. (Kirjner Institute), Mexico City
Universidad Autónoma Indígena de México, Mochicahui, Sinaloa
Instituto Superior Intercultural Ayuuk, Jaltepec de Candayoc, Oaxaca
Instituto Superior de Intérpretes y Traductores, Mexico City
Centro Universitario Incarnate Word (Incarnate Word University, Mexico City Campus), Mexico City
Universidad Incarnate Word (Incarnate Word University, Irapuato Campus), Irapuato, Guanajuato, Mexico

Universidad online
Centro de Estudios Avanzados de Las Américas CEAAM, Mexico City

References 

Universities
Mexico
Mexico